Gusev (masculine) or Guseva (feminine) may refer to:
Gusev (surname) (Guseva), Russian surname
Gusev (inhabited locality) (or Guseva), several inhabited localities in Russia
Gusev crater (Russia), impact crater in Rostov Oblast, Russia
Gusev (Martian crater)
"Gusev" (short story), an 1890 short story by Anton Chekhov